Love Is On the Way is a compilation album by American R&B/soul singer Luther Vandross, released in 1998.

Track listing
"Power of Love/Love Power" - 6:44
"Once You Know How" - 4:37
"Love the One You're With" - 5:05
"Come Back" - 4:16
"Sugar and Spice (I Found Me a Girl)" - 4:59
"Reflections" - 3:22
"Love Is On the Way (Real Love)" - 4:43
"Goin' Out of My Head" - 5:19
"I Gave It Up (When I Fell in Love)" - 4:46
"Here and Now" - 5:22

Certifications

References

1998 compilation albums
Luther Vandross compilation albums